Valentina Costanza (born 27 February 1987) is an Italian middle distance runner and 3000 metres steeplechaseer.

Biography
Costanza won four national titles at senior level. In add of this in 2010, establishing her Personal Best with 9:13.96 in 3000 metres indoor, she had reached the 59th place in the seasonal world lists.

Achievements

National titles
 Italian Athletics Championships
 3000 m steeplechase: 2010, 2011, 2012
Italian Athletics Indoor Championships
3000 m: 2016

References

External links
 

1987 births
Living people
Italian female steeplechase runners
Italian female middle-distance runners
Athletics competitors of Gruppo Sportivo Esercito
Competitors at the 2011 Summer Universiade